The 2017–18 season was Sepahan's 17th season in the Pro League, and their 24nd consecutive season in the top division of Iranian Football and 64th year in existence as a football club. They competed in the Hazfi Cup. Sepahan was captained by Hossein Papi.

Players

First-team squad

 

 [U21 = Under 21 year player | U23 = Under 23 year player| U25 = Under 25 year player]

For recent transfers, see List of Iranian football transfers summer 2017.

Current managerial staff

Matches

Pro league

League table

Results summary

Results by round

References

External links
  Club Official Website
  The Club page in Soccerway.com
  The Club page in Persianleague.com

 
Sepahan